The Women's 1500 Freestyle at the 2007 World Aquatics Championships took place on the morning of March 26 (prelims) and the evening of March 27 (finals) at the Rod Laver Arena in Melbourne, Australia.

The existing records when the event started were:
World Record (WR):  15:52.10, Janet Evans (USA), March 26, 1998, in Orlando, FL, USA.
Championship Record (CR): 16:00.18, Hannah Stockbauer (Germany), Barcelona 2003 (Jul.22.2003)

Results

Finals

Preliminaries

References

Women's 1500m Freestyle Preliminary results from the 2007 World Championships. Published by OmegaTiming.com (official timer of the '07 Worlds); retrieved 2009-06-29.
Women's 1500m Freestyle Final results from the 2007 World Championships. Published by OmegaTiming.com (official timer of the '07 Worlds); retrieved 2009-06-29.

World Aquatics Championships
Swimming at the 2007 World Aquatics Championships
2007 in women's swimming